IndARC is India's first underwater moored observatory in the Arctic region. It was deployed in 2014 at Kongsfjorden fjord, Svalbard, Norway which is midway between Norway and North Pole. Its research goal is to study the Arctic climate and its influence on the monsoon.

Development
This moored observatory is designed and developed by Earth System Science Organisation (ESSO)-National Institute of Ocean Technology (NIOT) and ESSO-National Centre for Polar and Ocean Research (NCPOR) with ESSO-Indian National Centre for Ocean Information Services (INCOIS).

See also
List of research stations in the Arctic

References

External links
Earth System Science Organisation

Indian Arctic Programme
Research stations in Svalbard
Research in India
Ny-Ålesund